El Bilal Touré (born 3 October 2001) is a Malian professional footballer who plays as a forward for La Liga club Almería and the Mali national team.

Club career

Reims
On 3 January 2020, Touré signed his first professional contract with Reims. He made his professional debut in a 4–1 Ligue 1 win over Angers on 1 February 2020, and scored Reims' first goal in the game.

Almería
On 1 September 2022, Touré moved to La Liga side Almería on a six-year contract. On 26 February 2023, he scored the only goal in a 1–0 victory over Barcelona, to be his club's first ever win against the latter.

International career
Touré won the 2019 Africa U-20 Cup of Nations with the Mali U20s. He debuted with the senior Mali national team in a 3–0 friendly win over Ghana on 9 October 2020, scoring on his debut.

Career statistics

Club

International 
Scores and results list Mali's goal tally first, score column indicates score after each Touré goal.

Honours
Mali U20
Africa U-20 Cup of Nations: 2019

References

External links
 
 

2001 births
Living people
Citizens of Mali through descent
Malian footballers
Mali international footballers
Mali youth international footballers
Ivorian footballers
Ivorian people of Malian descent
Sportspeople of Malian descent
Association football forwards
Stade de Reims players
UD Almería players
Ligue 1 players
Championnat National 2 players
2021 Africa Cup of Nations players
Malian expatriate footballers
Ivorian expatriate footballers
Expatriate footballers in France
Expatriate footballers in Spain